The Ground Forces of Serbia and Montenegro, known as the Ground Forces of the Federal Republic of Yugoslavia from 1992 to 2003, was the ground-based military branch of the Armed Forces of Serbia and Montenegro. It was formed on 20 May 1992 from the remnants of the Yugoslav Ground Forces and was disbanded on 5 June 2006 when the State Union of Serbia and Montenegro was dissolved.

Formation
The Ground Forces were composed of three armies, each made up of corps and independent units. The First Army was based in Belgrade, the Second Army was based in Podgorica and the Third Army was based in Niš.

References

Military of Serbia and Montenegro
Serbia and Montenegro
1992 establishments in Yugoslavia
2006 disestablishments in Serbia and Montenegro